Betts Hill is a mountain located in the Catskill Mountains of New York northeast of Delhi. Big Tom is located northwest of Betts Hill and Rattail Ridge is located north.

References

Mountains of Delaware County, New York
Mountains of New York (state)